Thomas Stonor, 3rd Baron Camoys (1797–1881) was a British peer, previously a member of Parliament. He was the son of another Thomas Stonor and Katherine Blundell, daughter of the art collector Henry Blundell.

Career
In 1817, he went to study at Paris University.

Thomas Stonor sat as a Member of Parliament for Oxford from 1832 to 1833 and was High Sheriff of Oxfordshire for 1836.

He succeeded to his title in 1839, after Queen Victoria terminated its abeyance in his favour. He was the appointed Lord-in-Waiting to the Queen from 1846 to 1852, 1853–1858, 1859–1866, and finally from 1868 to 1874.

Family
Thomas married Frances Towneley on 25 July 1821. They had the following issue:
 Charlotte (1822–1875), nun;
 Catherine (1823–1907), unmarried;
 Thomas (1824–1865), married Catherine Coulthurst, no issue;
 Francis (1829–1881), married Eliza Peel (a daughter of British Prime Minister Robert Peel), their eldest son was Francis Stonor, 4th Baron Camoys;
 Eliza (1830–1860), married Henry Silvertop;
 Edmund, a Catholic archbishop;
 Maria (1832–1914), married Charles Smythe, 7th Baronet;
 Agnes (1833–1887);
 Harriet (1836–1914), married Leopold Agar-Ellis, 5th Viscount Clifden, had issue;
 Caroline (1837–?), nun;
 Margaret (1839–1894), married Edward Pereira, had issue;
 Eleanor (1842–1886), nun;

They also had three other short-lived, unnamed children.

Death
Baron Camoys died on 18 January 1881. As his eldest son, Francis, had died a week before him, he was succeeded by his grandson, another Francis.

Line of descent from earlier Baron de Camoys

Thomas de Camoys, 1st Baron Camoys (m. Elizabeth Louches)
Sir Richard de Camoys (m. Joan Poynings)
Hugh de Camoys, 2nd Baron Camoys
Margaret de Camoys (m. Ralph Radmylde)
Margaret Radmylde (m. John Goring)
John Goring (m. Joan Hewster)
John Goring (m. Constance Dyke)
William Goring (m. Elizabeth Covert)
Henry Goring (m. Dorothy Everard)
William Goring (m. Ann Burbridge)
Henry Goring (m. Eleanor Kingsmill)
Sir William Goring, 1st Baronet (m. Eleanor Francis)
Sir Henry Goring, 2nd Baronet (m. Mary Chamberlain)
Ann Goring (m. Richard Biddulph)
John Biddulph (m. Mary Arundell)
Mary Biddulph (m. Thomas Stonor (1710–1772))
Charles Stonor (1737–1781) (m. Mary Blount)
Thomas Stonor (1766–1831) (m. Catherine Blundell)
Thomas Stonor, 3rd Baron Camoys

Ancestry

Notes

References
Kidd, Charles and Williamson, David. "Camoys, Baron (Stonor) (Baron E 1383)." Debrett's Peerage & Baronetage 1995. London: Debrett's Peerage Limited, 1995. p. 208, 
Bence-Jones, Mark. The Catholic Families. London: Constable, 1992

External links

1797 births
1881 deaths
Stonor, Thomas
Stewards of Henley Royal Regatta
Stonor, Thomas
UK MPs who inherited peerages
Stonor, Thomas
Whig (British political party) Lords-in-Waiting
High Sheriffs of Oxfordshire
3